Sherrard Island is an island in the Aboriginal Shire of Lockhart River in Queensland, Australia.

Geography 

See also
 List of islands of Australia

References

Islands on the Great Barrier Reef
Aboriginal Shire of Lockhart River